Quinebaug Lake State Park is a public recreation area covering  in the town of Killingly, Connecticut. The state park offers opportunities for fishing and non-motorized boating on Wauregan Reservoir. The park is managed by the Connecticut Department of Energy and Environmental Protection.

History 
The  Wauregan Reservoir, also known as Quinebaug Pond and Quinebaug Lake, is a lake of natural origin that has had its size increased by a dam at its outlet; it reaches depths of 31 feet. The lake is fed by Quinebaug Brook, also known as Quandock Brook. The reservoir and surroundings entered the Connecticut Register and Manual as Quinebaug Lake State Park in 1964.

Activities and amenities
Quinebaug Lake is a state-designated bass and catfish management lake. A boat launch is located at the lake's northern end.

References

External links
Quinebaug Lake State Park Connecticut Department of Energy and Environmental Protection

State parks of Connecticut
Parks in Windham County, Connecticut
Killingly, Connecticut
Bodies of water of Windham County, Connecticut
Lakes of Connecticut
Protected areas established in 1964
1964 establishments in Connecticut